Penelope K, by the way is an Australian television series for pre-school children (aged four to six). It was produced by Blink Films and Freehand for CBeebies Australia.

In each episode, Penelope K (played by Amanda Bishop) is asked a general knowledge question by a child, which she answers by researching the contents and talking to characters inhabiting her Information Station.

Searching for answers she talks to her sock puppet called Squirm, a pair of fish named Hank and Frank and a shadow rabbit Tewey, while a band of musical instruments helps her find the answers through music.

Production
The series was produced by much of the same team behind The Upside Down Show. Michael Bourchier was the executive producer of both shows and wanted to create a show starring Amanda Bishop, who played Mrs. Foil on The Upside Down Show and was chosen to play Penelope K. Bourchier said in a 2010 interview that he "knew she was a great physical comedian [from her work on Upside]. I conceived the idea for the show with her in mind."

References

External links
Penelope K's homepage on CBeebies website

BBC children's television shows
2010s Australian television series
Australian children's television series
Australian television shows featuring puppetry
Television series by Freehand Productions
CBeebies
Australian preschool education television series
2010s preschool education television series
English-language television shows